Ali Brown (born August 3, 1971) is an American entrepreneur business coach, author, speaker, and television commentator. She is the founder and CEO of Ali International LLC, an enterprise devoted to empowering women entrepreneurs around the world that currently has over 65,000 members in her online and offline programs. In 2009, Brown's company ranked #263 on the Inc. 500 list of fastest-growing private companies in the nation. In 2010, Brown was a recipient of the Enterprising Women of the Year award, and in April 2010 she was featured in the season finale of ABC's Secret Millionaire.

Career
Brown was born in Stamford, Connecticut.

Awards and recognition 
 In 2009, Brown's company, Ali International, LLC, ranked #263 on the Inc. 500 list of fastest growing private companies in the nation. 
 In 2010, Brown was a winner of the Enterprising Women of the Year award
 Included in the Ernst & Young 2010 Class of Entrepreneurial Winning Women
 Winner of the Stevie Award for Women Helping Women
 Recipient of the Commitment to Philanthropy award from the Step Up Women's Network
 Named "The Entrepreneurial Guru for Women" by Business News Daily

References 

21st-century American businesspeople
Living people
1971 births